Champsochromis spilorhynchus is a species of haplochromine cichlid. It is found in Malawi, Mozambique, and Tanzania in Lake Malawi, Lake Malombe and the upper Shire River.

References

Photo link
Malawicichlids.com

spilorhynchus
Taxa named by Charles Tate Regan
Fish described in 1922
Taxonomy articles created by Polbot